Former Niagara Falls High School is a historic high school located at Niagara Falls in Niagara County, New York, USA.  It was built in 1923 and added to the existing gymnasium structure, and designed by local architect Simon Larke, who also designed the James G. Marshall House.  The original structure is in the Neoclassical revival style. An addition was constructed in 1963.

The building was threatened with demolition in late 2000, but was spared and is currently used as the Niagara Arts & Cultural Center. The multi-arts center features over 60 artist studios, two galleries, two theaters, a certified sound stage and movie production facility, the Niagara Falls High School alumni center and a café and gift shop.

It was listed on the National Register of Historic Places in 2002.

References

External links
Former Niagara Falls High School - U.S. National Register of Historic Places on Waymarking.com
Preservation Studios Buffalo, NY: historic building rehabilitation and preservation consultants
 Niagara Arts & Cultural Center

School buildings on the National Register of Historic Places in New York (state)
School buildings completed in 1924
Buildings and structures in Niagara Falls, New York
William B. Ittner buildings
National Register of Historic Places in Niagara County, New York
1924 establishments in New York (state)